Gloydius blomhoffii, commonly known as the mamushi, Japanese moccasin, Japanese pit viper, Qichun snake, Salmusa or Japanese mamushi, is a venomous pit viper species found in Japan. It was once considered to have 4 subspecies, but it is now considered monotypic.

This species, along with the yamakagashi (Rhabdophis tigrinus) and the Okinawan habu (Protobothrops flavoviridis), are the most venomous snakes in Japan.  Every year, 2000–3000 people in Japan are bitten by a mamushi. Bitten victims typically require one week of treatment in a hospital. Severe bites require intensive care, and approximately 10 victims die annually.

Etymology
The specific name, blomhoffii, is in honor of Jan Cock Blomhoff, who was director of the Dutch trading colony in Nagasaki, Japan from  1817 to 1824.

Description

The body pattern consists of a pale gray, reddish-brown, or yellow-brown background, overlaid with a series of irregularly-shaped lateral blotches. These blotches are bordered with black and often have lighter centers. The head is dark brown or black, with beige or pale-gray sides.

Common names
The common name in English is mamushi, or Japanese mamushi. In China, it is known as the Qichun snake or soil snake/viper.

Geographic range
It is found in Japan. According to Gloyd and Conant, there is no evidence to support claims that this species occurs in the Ryukyu Islands. The type locality given is "Japan".

Habitat
It occurs in a range of habitats, including swamps, marshes, meadows, open woodland, rocky hillsides, and montane rock outcroppings.

Diet

It is typically an ambush predator that uses its excellent camouflage to hide itself in vegetation or leaf litter. It hunts and eats mainly rodents, but also small birds, lizards, and insects. It is often found in and around farmland due to the associated rodent populations.

Venom

Characteristics
The venom of this species varies very little in Japan in terms of both its potency and its effects.  According to Yoshimitsu (2005), this species and the Okinawan habu (Protobothrops flavoviridis), another pit viper, are the most venomous snakes in Japan.  The venom's lethality as measured by LD50 in mice following intraperitoneal injection is in the range 0.3 mg/kg to 1.22 mg/kg.  The venom mostly contains haemolytic toxins, but it also has two neurotoxins—an alpha-toxin that is a post-synaptic inhibitor and a beta-toxin that is a pre-synaptic inhibitor. Because the beta-toxin acts pre-synaptically, its effects cannot be blocked or treated by anticholinesterases.  The venom contains an anticoagulant, mamushi L-amino-acid oxidase (M-LAO). It also contains the peptide ablomin which is highly similar in amino acid sequence to that of the venom, helothermine, of the Mexican beaded lizard (Heloderma horridum).

Treatments for envenomations
There is an effective antivenom manufactured in both Japan and China. Its effectiveness is increased when co-administered with a serine protease inhibitor such as FOY (see, e.g. Camostat). In common with many other venomous snakes, the mamushi is highly resistant to its own venom because of various neutralising factors present in its sera including phospholipase A2 (PLA2) inhibitors; these and other inhibitors are the target of antivenom development.

Every year, 2000-3000 people in Japan are bitten by mamushi, severe bites require intensive care, and approximately 10 victims die. There have been case reports of kidney failure, visual disturbances, palsy, and miscarriage in pregnant women.

In one study in Japan, mamushi bite victims required a median duration of 7 days of hospital treatment followed by a median of 31 days of out-patient treatment; the time to achieve a full recovery was even longer, taking up to several months. The treatment protocol involved incision of the wound for exclusion of the venom, and injection of mamushi antivenom.

Taxonomy
This species is similar to the cottonmouths and copperheads (Agkistrodon sp.) of the Americas, and it was long considered part of the same group (see synonymy).

References

Further reading
Boie H (1826). "Merkmale eineger japanischer Lurche ". Isis von Oken 19: 203-216. (Trigonocephalus blomhoffii, new species, pp. 214–215). (in German and Latin).

External links

 
 Gloydius blomhoffii at the Encyclopedia of Japanese Reptiles. Accessed 20 December 2007.

Gloydius
Endemic reptiles of Japan
Reptiles described in 1826